Whanganui Central is the central business district and central suburb of Whanganui, in the Whanganui District and Manawatū-Whanganui region of New Zealand's North Island.

Demographics

It had a population of 4,203 at the 2018 New Zealand census, an increase of 417 people (11.0%) since the 2013 census, and an increase of 72 people (1.7%) since the 2006 census. There were 1,878 households. There were 1,980 males and 2,220 females, giving a sex ratio of 0.89 males per female, with 705 people (16.8%) aged under 15 years, 843 (20.1%) aged 15 to 29, 1,803 (42.9%) aged 30 to 64, and 855 (20.3%) aged 65 or older.

Ethnicities were 72.1% European/Pākehā, 28.6% Māori, 5.1% Pacific peoples, 7.3% Asian, and 2.1% other ethnicities (totals add to more than 100% since people could identify with multiple ethnicities).

The proportion of people born overseas was 15.8%, compared with 27.1% nationally.

Although some people objected to giving their religion, 46.1% had no religion, 35.3% were Christian, 1.3% were Hindu, 0.4% were Muslim, 0.6% were Buddhist and 6.4% had other religions.

Of those at least 15 years old, 528 (15.1%) people had a bachelor or higher degree, and 840 (24.0%) people had no formal qualifications. The employment status of those at least 15 was that 1,266 (36.2%) people were employed full-time, 507 (14.5%) were part-time, and 267 (7.6%) were unemployed.

Features

Whanganui Regional Museum opened in 1892 and contains a range of displays about Whangaui's Māori and European settlement.

Sarjeant Gallery opened in 1919.

Education

References 

Suburbs of Whanganui
Central business districts in New Zealand
Settlements on the Whanganui River